WRP may refer to:

Computing 
 Wireless Routing Protocol, a decentralized method for computer communication
 Windows Resource Protection, a feature in some Windows operating systems
 Workflow Resource Planning, a class of Enterprise Resource Planning system

Political parties 
 Wessex Regionalist Party, a minor political party in the United Kingdom
 Wildrose Party, a defunct political party in Alberta, Canada
 Workers' Revolutionary Party (disambiguation), various political parties

Government programs 

 Witness relocation program, a US federal program for protecting witnesses
 Wetlands Reserve Program, a voluntary US federal program
 Workforce Recruitment Program, a US federal recruitment and referral program

Other 
 Waterloo Regional Police, Ontario, Canada
 Warwick Parkway railway station in England
 Wrestling Retribution Project, a TV program in the USA
 Whitehead Research Project, a group focused on Alfred North Whitehead
 Water reclamation plant, a type of facility used to treat wastewater
White Rabbit Project (TV series), a cancelled Netflix show